The Maroon Dam is a rock and earth-fill embankment dam with an un-gated spillway across the Burnett Creek that is located in the South East region of  Queensland, Australia. The main purpose of the dam is for irrigation of the Scenic Rim Regional Council region. The impounded reservoir is also called Maroon Dam.

Location and features

The primary inflow of the reservoir is Burnett Creek, a tributary of Logan River.

Construction of the dam commenced in 1969 and was completed in 1973. The  dam wall holds back the  reservoir when at full capacity. Initially managed by the SunWater, management of the dam was transferred to Seqwater in July 2008.

The reservoir was officially opened on 16 July 1975 by Neville Hewitt, the Queensland Minister for Water Resources. The reservoir contains some areas of standing timber in its upper reaches. It is generally shallow with extensive weedbeds. Drought in February 2003 reduced water levels in the dam to 12%. It was at 18% capacity in November 2003.

Recreation
Camping is not permitted on the dam's property. Private accommodation is available near the dam.

Fishing and water skiing are popular activities for visitors to the waters held back by the dam. There is a single concrete boat ramp and no restrictions on boat numbers.

The dam is stocked with silver perch, golden perch and bass. Additionally spangled perch are present. The Maroon Moogerah Fish Management Association is the local fish stocking group. A stocked impoundment permit is required to fish in the dam.

See also

List of dams in Queensland

References

External links

 

Reservoirs in Queensland
Dams completed in 1973
Logan River
Scenic Rim Region
Dams in Queensland
Embankment dams
Rock-filled dams
Earth-filled dams
Great Dividing Range
Beaudesert, Queensland
1973 establishments in Australia